Geologists Seamounts (alternatively named South West Hawaii Group) are seamounts in the Pacific Ocean,  south of Honolulu, Hawaii and  southwest from Big Island. Clockwise from north they are named Perret, Jaggar, McCall, Pensacola, Daly, Swordfish, Cross, Washington and Ellis. The seamounts developed during the Cretaceous, about 80 million years ago, and there is no geological relationship to the neighbouring Hawaiian Islands although there may be one to the Musicians Seamounts. Rocks dredged from the seamounts include iron-manganese crusts, carbonates and basalts. Corals and sponges have been recorded.

References

Sources 

 

Cretaceous volcanism
Seamounts of the Pacific Ocean